The Atractaspididae (atractaspidids) are a family of venomous snakes found in Africa and the Middle East, commonly called mole vipers, stiletto snakes, or burrowing asps. Currently, 12 genera are recognized.

Description
This family includes many genera formerly classed in other families and subfamilies, on the basis of fang type. It includes fangless (aglyphous), rear-fanged (opisthoglyphous), fixed-fanged (proteroglyphous), and viper-like (solenoglyphous) species. Early molecular and physiological data linking this subfamily to others were ambiguous and often contradictory, which means the taxonomy of this subfamily has been highly contentious. The nominate family, Atractaspididae, has itself been moved to and from other taxa, such as potentially forming a trichotomy with Elapidae and Colubridae, reinforcing the ambiguity of this subfamily.

Geographic range
This subfamily is found in Africa and the Middle East.

Venom
Many of these snakes are inoffensive or far too small to envenomate a person effectively. However, some can inflict severe tissue necrosis; e.g. if the victim's thumb is bitten, the tip of that digit may be lost. Relapses may occur long after the bite.

Very few deaths have resulted from accidents with these snakes, although large individuals of Atractaspis microlepidota and other long-glanded species are very likely to be dangerous. Some of the long-fanged species are able to stab their prey (or an unfortunate human) even while their mouths are closed, and the typical grasp used by herpetologists to securely hold venomous snakes is not safe for this group. This ability to stab sideways even with a closed mouth is the basis for an English name used for some of them: "side-stabbing snakes" or "side-stabbers".

Genera

Taxonomy
This family was previously classified as a subfamily of the Colubridae: the Aparallactinae.

Gallery

See also
 List of atractaspidid species and subspecies

References

External links

 
 Atractaspids at Life is Short but Snakes are Long
 Stiletto snakes at Tetrapod Zoology
 iNaturalist link

 
Snake subfamilies
Taxa named by Albert Günther